Erik Pfannmöller (born February 7, 1985 in Halle (Saale)) is a German slalom canoeist who competed at the international level from 2001 to 2008. After quitting his successful sports career in 2009, Pfannmöller became a serial entrepreneur, founding three companies until today.

World Cup individual podiums

Pfannmöller won a gold medal in the K1 team event at the 2007 ICF Canoe Slalom World Championships in Foz do Iguaçu. He won the overall World Cup title in K1 in 2006 and 2008. He also won five medals at the European Championships (3 silvers and 2 bronzes).

Business career 
In 2010, he graduated from the HHL Leipzig Graduate School of Management with a degree in business administration. In January 2010, he founded the company "Teambon", which was acquired by DailyDeal just two months later. In April 2010, he founded the Berlin-based startup "mysportbrands" together with Albert Schwarzmeier. Since 2015, he is founder and CEO of "Solvemate", a B2B SaaS company that uses machine learning to automate customer service with the help of chatbots.1 European Championship counting for World Cup points

References

German male canoeists
Living people
1985 births
Medalists at the ICF Canoe Slalom World Championships
Sportspeople from Halle (Saale)